Ernest John Collett (March 3, 1895 – December 21, 1951) was a Canadian ice hockey player who competed in the 1924 Winter Olympics.

Early life
Collett was born in York County, Ontario. Before joining the Toronto Granites, he played in the amateur leagues for the Toronto Riverside Hockey Club, Toronto Crescents, Toronto Newman Hall, and Toronto Parkdale.

Career
Collett was a member of the Toronto Granites team, which won a gold medal for Canada in ice hockey at the 1924 Winter Olympics. He was also Canada's first ever flag bearer at opening ceremonies of the Winter Olympics.

References

External links
 
databaseOlympics.com profile

1895 births
1951 deaths
Canadian ice hockey goaltenders
Ice hockey players at the 1924 Winter Olympics
Medalists at the 1924 Winter Olympics
Olympic gold medalists for Canada
Olympic ice hockey players of Canada
Olympic medalists in ice hockey
Ontario Hockey Association Senior A League (1890–1979) players
People from the Regional Municipality of York